Kristina "Kija" Kockar (born 26 May 1989) is a Serbian singer and TV personality, who rose to prominence by winning the first season of Serbian reality TV show Zadruga.

Personal life
Kristina Kockar was born on 26 May 1989 in Zrenjanin, SFR Yugoslavia to mother Nadica Zeljković, who worked as restaurant server. After graduating from the Zrenjanin Grammar School, Kija attended Hotelier College in Belgrade. Before becoming famous, she worked as a flight attendant in Airpink, Air Serbia and Etihad Airways. 

On 26 September 2016 she married singer and former Pinkove Zvezde contestant, Slobodan Radanović. On 7 August 2018, it was reported that Kija had divorced from Radanović.

Media career
In November 2017, Kockar entered reality series Zadruga, aired on RTV Pink, as an anonymous personality after her husband had cheated on her on air with another contestant, Luna Đogani. She immediately attracted sympathies and support from the audience and eventually won the show on 20 June the following year, with more than 55% of the public votes. 

After the show, she decided to pursue a career in music with her debut single "Ne vraćam se na staro" (I'm Not Going Back to the Old), released on 20 July 2018. The official music video for the song has collected more than thirty million views on YouTube. Additionally, in October 2019, Kija published her autobiography, titled Moj potpis (My Signature), in which she reflected on her relationship with Radanović and her time in Zadruga. Although becoming one of the biggest attractions at the Belgrade Book Fair, the book received polarizing reception in the public. Between 2018 and 2019, she also served as a judge on two talent shows broadcast on TV Pink, Pinkove Zvezde: All Talents and Pinkove Zvezdice: All Stars. In November, Kockar was declared Serbian gay icon of 2018.

Filmography

Discography 
Extended plays
 Kija (2021)
 Karijera (2022)

Singles
 "Ne vraćam se na staro" (2018); feat. Ministarke
 "Potpis" (2018)
 "Ko bi rekao" (2018); feat. Stoja
 "Amorova strela" (2019)
 "Zlatan" (2019)
 "Sanjam" (2019)
 "Bejbi" (2020)
 "Sviđaš mi se" (2020)
 "Da li si dovoljno lud da meni kažeš da" (2021)
 "Karijera" (2021)
 "Pepeljuga" (2022)

Awards and nominations

References

External links 
 Kristina Kockar on Instagram
 Kristina Kockar on Twitter
 Kristina Kockar on Deezer
 Kristina Kockar on Discgos

1989 births
Living people
Musicians from Zrenjanin
Writers from Zrenjanin
Serbian television personalities
Reality show winners
21st-century Serbian women singers
Serbian pop singers
Serbian folk-pop singers